Cramp fasciculation syndrome (CFS) is a rare peripheral nerve hyperexcitability disorder. It is more severe than the related (and common) disorder known as benign fasciculation syndrome; it causes fasciculations, cramps, pain, fatigue, and muscle stiffness similar to those seen in neuromyotonia (another related condition). Patients with CFS, like those with neuromyotonia, may also experience paresthesias.
Most cases of cramp fasciculation syndrome are idiopathic.

Cramp fasciculation syndrome is diagnosed by clinical examination and electromyography (EMG). Fasciculation is the only abnormality (if any) seen with EMG.
Cramp fasciculation syndrome is a chronic condition. Treatment options include anti-seizure medications such as carbamazepine, immunosuppressive drugs and plasmapheresis.

Signs and Symptoms 

Symptoms are very similar to those found in benign fasciculation syndrome and include:
 muscle cramping (primary symptom) 
 muscle pain
 muscle stiffness
 generalized fatigue
 anxiety
 exercise intolerance
 globus sensations
 paraesthesias.
 hyperreflexia

Diagnosis 

The procedure of diagnosis for Cramp Fasciculation Syndrome (CFS) is closely aligned with the diagnosis procedure for benign fasciculation syndrome (BFS). The differentiation between a diagnosis of BFS versus CFS is usually more severe and prominent pain, cramps and stiffness associated with CFS.

Treatment 

Treatment is similar to treatment for benign fasciculation syndrome.

Carbamazepine therapy has been found to provide moderate reductions in symptoms.

References

External links 
 https://web.archive.org/web/20110715114849/http://isaacsyndrome.proboards.com/index.cgi

Neurological disorders
Syndromes